Mowkaiaw is one of the 60 Legislative Assembly constituencies of Meghalaya state in India. It is part of West Jaintia Hills district and is reserved for candidates belonging to the Scheduled Tribes. It falls under Shillong Lok Sabha constituency and its current MLA is Nujorki Sungoh of United Democratic Party.

Members of Legislative Assembly
The list of MLAs are given below

|-style="background:#E9E9E9;"
!Year
!colspan="2" align="center"|Party
!align="center" |MLA
!Votes
|-
|2013
|bgcolor="#DDDDDD"|
|align="left"| Independent
|align="left"| Robinus Syngkon
|7064
|-
|2018
|bgcolor="#CEF2E0"|
|align="left"| United Democratic Party
|align="left"| Nujorki Sungoh
|6691 
|}

Election results

2023

2018

See also
List of constituencies of the Meghalaya Legislative Assembly
West Jaintia Hills district  
Shillong (Lok Sabha constituency)

References

Assembly constituencies of Meghalaya
West Jaintia Hills district